Vanni may refer to:

People

Given name
 Vanni Corbellini (born 1955), Italian actor and director
 Vanni Marcoux (1877–1962), French opera singer
 Vanni Rodeghiero (born 1942), Italian javelin thrower
 Vanni Treves (1940–2019), Italian-British business executive

Surname
 Andrea Vanni (1332–1414), Italian painter
 Edo Vanni (1918-2007), American baseball player, coach and manager 
 Francesco Vanni (1563–1610), Italian painter
 Giorgio Vanni (born 1963), Italian singer-songwriter
 Giovanni Battista Vanni (1599–1660), Italian painter and engraver
 Lippo Vanni (fl. 1344–1372), Italian painter
 Luca Vanni (born 1985), Italian tennis player
 Massimo Vanni (born 1946), Italian film and television actor
 Raffaello Vanni (1590–1657), Italian painter
 Raniero Vanni d'Archirafi (born 1931), former Italian diplomat
 Renata Vanni (1909–2004), Italian-American film actress
 Sam Vanni (1908–1992), Finnish painter
 Simone Vanni (born 1979), Italian Olympic fencer
 Tim Vanni (born 1961), American Olympic wrestler
 Turino Vanni (fl. 14th century), Italian painter
 Vanna Vanni (1920–1998), Italian film actress
 Ville Vänni (born 1979), Finnish musician

Places
 Vanni (Sri Lanka), an area of northern Sri Lanka
 Vanni Electoral District
 Vanni forest
 Vannimai or Vanni chieftaincies, feudal land divisions in northern Sri Lanka from the 12th century to 1803
 Vanni Peak, a mountain in Graham Land, Antarctica

Other uses
 Compensation marriage, a practice known as vanni in the Punjab
 Vanni Fucci, a character in Inferno by Dante Alighieri
 Vanni (crab), freshwater crabs of family Gecarcinucidae

See also
 Vani (disambiguation)
 Vany (disambiguation)